AATA or Aata may refer to:

 Administrative Appeal Tribunal of Australia
 American Art Therapy Association
 Animal Transportation Association, a worldwide nonprofit organization
 Ann Arbor Area Transportation Authority, formerly the Ann Arbor Transportation Authority (AATA)
 Aata (2007 film), an Indian Telugu romantic action film
 Aata (2011 film), an Indian Kannada film